Alain Vigneron (born 1 September 1954) is a former French racing cyclist. He rode in ten Grand Tours between 1980 and 1986.

References

External links

1954 births
Living people
French male cyclists
Sportspeople from Bas-Rhin
Cyclists from Grand Est